Schoenoplectus pungens is a species of flowering plant in the sedge family known as common threesquare, common three-square bulrush and sharp club-rush. It is a herbaceous emergent plant that is widespread across much of North and South America as well as Europe, New Zealand and Australia.

Habitat
It is resistant to fire.

Description
The foliage is dark green, rough and dense. The small flowers are grouped in dense spikelets, with of 1–7 spikelets on each stem. The seeds are brown.

It is closely related to S. americanus, and many S. pungens specimens have long been misidentified as S. americanus.

References

External links
Jepson Manual Treatment
Washington Burke Museum
Photo gallery

pungens
Flora of North America
Flora of South America
Flora of Europe
Flora of Australia
Plants described in 1805
Freshwater plants